Rhizobium phaseoli is a root nodule bacterium.

References

Rhizobiaceae